Vernon Hills is a station on Metra's North Central Service in Vernon Hills, Illinois. In Metra's zone-based fare system, Vernon Hills is in zone G. As of 2018, Vernon Hills is the 118th busiest of Metra's 236 non-downtown stations, with an average of 409 weekday boardings. Vernon Hills station is an A-Framed structure with an analog clock tower emerging from the right slope. The canopy on the platform is also an A-Framed structure.

As of December 12, 2022, Vernon Hills is served by all 14 trains (seven in each direction) on weekdays.

References

External links 

Flickr image
Station from Google Maps Street View

Metra stations in Illinois
Railway stations in Lake County, Illinois
1996 establishments in Illinois
Railway stations in the United States opened in 1996